The Municipality of Kamnik is a municipality in northern Slovenia. The seat of the municipality is the town of Kamnik. Today it is part of the Central Slovenia Statistical Region. It is the 15th-largest municipality by area in Slovenia.

Settlements
In addition to the municipal seat of Kamnik, the municipality also includes the following settlements:

 Bela
 Bela Peč
 Bistričica
 Brezje nad Kamnikom
 Briše
 Buč
 Češnjice v Tuhinju
 Cirkuše v Tuhinju
 Črna pri Kamniku
 Črni Vrh v Tuhinju
 Gabrovnica
 Godič
 Golice
 Gozd
 Gradišče v Tuhinju
 Hrib pri Kamniku
 Hruševka
 Jeranovo
 Kališe
 Kamniška Bistrica
 Klemenčevo
 Kostanj
 Košiše
 Kregarjevo
 Krivčevo
 Kršič
 Laniše
 Laseno
 Laze v Tuhinju
 Liplje
 Loke v Tuhinju
 Mali Hrib
 Mali Rakitovec
 Markovo
 Mekinje
 Motnik
 Nevlje
 Okrog pri Motniku
 Okroglo
 Oševek
 Pirševo
 Podbreg
 Podgorje
 Podhruška
 Podjelše
 Podlom
 Podstudenec
 Poljana
 Poreber
 Potok
 Potok v Črni
 Praproče v Tuhinju
 Pšajnovica
 Ravne pri Šmartnem
 Rožično
 Rudnik pri Radomljah
 Sela pri Kamniku
 Sidol
 Šmarca
 Šmartno v Tuhinju
 Smrečje v Črni
 Snovik
 Soteska
 Sovinja Peč
 Špitalič
 Spodnje Palovče
 Spodnje Stranje
 Srednja Vas pri Kamniku
 Stahovica
 Stara Sela
 Stebljevek
 Stolnik
 Studenca
 Trebelno pri Palovčah
 Trobelno
 Tučna
 Tunjice
 Tunjiška Mlaka
 Vaseno
 Velika Lašna
 Velika Planina
 Veliki Hrib
 Veliki Rakitovec
 Vir pri Nevljah
 Vodice nad Kamnikom
 Volčji Potok
 Vranja Peč
 Vrhpolje pri Kamniku
 Žaga
 Zagorica nad Kamnikom
 Zajasovnik
 Zakal
 Zavrh pri Črnivcu
 Zduša
 Zgornje Palovče
 Zgornje Stranje
 Zgornji Motnik
 Zgornji Tuhinj
 Znojile
 Žubejevo
 Županje Njive

References

External links

Municipality of Kamnik on Geopedia
 Kamnik.si - official website of the municipality

 
Kamnik
1994 establishments in Slovenia